Mstrkrft (stylized as MSTRKRFT; disemvowelment of "master craft") is a Canadian electronic music duo from Toronto. The group was started in 2005 by Jesse F. Keeler of Death from Above and Al-P (Alex Puodziukas) formerly of the Mississauga, Ontario<ref>IMO Records.  "MSTRKRFT Biography" , IMO Records' Retrieved on 14 March 2011.</ref> electropop group Girlsareshort.Rayner, Ben. "On Death and dying: Death from Above 1979: Keeler and Grainger fold band, leaving an indie rock legacy", Toronto Star, 2006-12-31, p. C5. Al-P was also the producer for Death from Above 1979's album You're a Woman, I'm a Machine as well as several of (Jesse's former band) Black Cat #13's records. The duo have been close friends, as well as work partners, for a long time. Mstrkrft also produced Die Mannequin's first EP, How to Kill, and Magneta Lane's second LP, Dancing With Daggers.

Mstrkrft have been commissioned to remix songs by such artists as Death From Above 1979, Justice, Kylie Minogue, Katy Perry, Bloc Party, Ayumi Hamasaki, Metric, Wolfmother, Annie and The Kills.

History

Their first single was "Easy Love", released in 2006 on Last Gang Records. They released their second single, "Work On You", on 6 July. In contrast to the "Easy Love" music video, "Work On You" featured animated robots, similar to those found in classic cartoons (see: Voltron, Transformers ). Although The Looks is Mstrkrft's first album featuring original content, the band has created remixes from a variety of other artists ranging from Buck 65 to The Kills to Death from Above 1979.

Mstrkrft released their first LP, The Looks, on 18 July 2006 in the United States and 2 February 2007 in Britain. Keeler and Al-P told Eye Weekly weeks before the release of The Looks, that as the album was being finished, the planning stages for a follow-up record had already begun. Describing the upcoming album's new direction, Al-P said that the album would be "darker, underground disco and house with elements of American rock music."

The 2007 version of their song "Street Justice" was also released as a single. On the band's website message board, Keeler mentioned they were also working on a compilation album composed of their remixed tracks. Street Justice was also featured on the THQ action game, Saints Row 2. Neon Knights was also featured on Need For Speed: Pro Street, their remix for Justice's "D.A.N.C.E." was featured in the film Meet the Spartans, and "Work on You" was featured in Dirt 2.

Their song "Paris" was featured in a 2006 commercial for the online music store URGE. In 2007 Mstrkrft appeared at the WEMF World Electronic Music Festival.

In September 2007 Mstrkrft performed at an Australian spring music festival "Parklife" in Brisbane. They performed their remix of the song "Woman" from Modular label mates Wolfmother. Andrew Stockdale of Wolfmother appeared on stage and sang live while Mstrkrft performed the remix.

In 2008 through Obeygiant.com released a mix cd with Z-Trip. In conjunction with this CD, Obey offered the Art work print, entitled Soundclash of the Titans. On 24 May 2008 Mstrkrft were featured on the famous BBC Radio 1 show, The Essential Mix. Mstrkrft later performed at the 2008 Bonnaroo Music and Arts Festival, which included a diverse group of artists ranging from Metallica to Jack Johnson.

In 2009, their remix of "Woman" by Wolfmother was featured in the film Lesbian Vampire Killers. On 17 March 2009, Mstrkrft released their second LP, Fist of God. All songs were written by Jesse F. Keeler and Al-P. Initial critical response has been average at best, with major periodicals Spin, Rolling Stone, and Blender giving the album less-than-stellar reviews. The album features guest appearances by John Legend, E-40, N.O.R.E., and Lil' Mo, among others. In 2010, their song “Bounce’ featuring N.O.R.E. was featured in DJ Hero 2.

In 2011 they released two new singles "Beards Again" and "Back in the USSA". "Beards Again" was later featured on the Injustice: Gods Among Us video game soundtrack in 2013.

The band's third LP, Operator'' was released on 22 July 2016. The singles "Little Red Hen" and "Party Line" were released in March and May 2016 respectively to promote the album.

Starting in May 2019, MSTRKRFT started releasing a single every month on ORO Records, including "City Violence", "La Chiaccherona", "All Night, All Night", "Buffalo Fat" and "Dorsia".

Band name
The band took out the vowels from their name in order to avoid trademark infringement with Mastercraft, a Canadian tools company. The 'C' was changed to a 'K' in order to maintain the pronunciation and image of the original name.

Discography

Albums

EPs

Singles

See also
 Death from Above
 List of bands from Canada
 Last Gang Records

References

External links

 Official website
 
 Cover Story The MSTRKRFT Moment
 RCRDLBL
 Video Interview with MSTRKRFT

Musical groups established in 2005
Musical groups from Toronto
Canadian dance music groups
Canadian electronic music groups
Canadian DJs
Canadian musical duos
Club DJs
Dance-punk musical groups
Remixers
2005 establishments in Ontario
Bands with fictional stage personas
Masked musicians
Electronic dance music duos
Dim Mak Records artists
679 Artists artists